Luis Adrián Medero (born 24 January 1973 in Hurlingham, Buenos Aires) is a former Argentine football defender who works as the joint manager of C.A.I alongside Claudio Marini.

Playing career 
Medero started his career in 1992 with Argentine giants Boca Juniors, at the club he won two titles, the Apertura 1992 championship and the Copa Nicolas Leoz. He made a total of 84 appearances for the club in all competitions, scoring 1 goal.

In 1996, he was transferred to Colón de Santa Fe where he played for 5 years.

In 2001, he joined San Lorenzo de Almagro where he was part of the Copa Sudamericana winning team of 2002.

After leaving San Lorenzo Medero had stints with Olimpo de Bahía Blanca and Argentinos Juniors before joining Ecuadorian Club Sport Emelec in 2005, Gimnasia de Jujuy in 2006 and then Almagro in 2007.

Coaching career 
During the 2008–2009 Primera B Nacional season, Medero had his first coaching opportunity in a joint appointment with Claudio Marini at Comisión de Actividades Infantiles. During the duo's tenure, CAI was able to avoid relegation. In 2011, Medero and Marini became the coaches for Boca Unidos.

Titles

External links

 Luis Medero – Argentine Primera statistics at Fútbol XXI  
 Luis Medero at BDFA.com.ar 

Argentine footballers
Association football defenders
Boca Juniors footballers
Club Atlético Colón footballers
San Lorenzo de Almagro footballers
Olimpo footballers
Club Almagro players
Argentinos Juniors footballers
C.S. Emelec footballers
Gimnasia y Esgrima de Jujuy footballers
Argentine Primera División players
Argentine expatriate footballers
Expatriate footballers in Ecuador
Argentine football managers
Comisión de Actividades Infantiles managers
People from Hurlingham Partido
1973 births
Living people
Argentina youth international footballers
Sportspeople from Buenos Aires Province
Club Atlético Patronato managers